The Dream Mine, or Relief Mine, is a mine in Salem, Utah, built by John Hyrum Koyle in the 1890s and incorporated in 1909. Koyle prophesied that the mine would provide financial support for members of the Church of Jesus Christ of Latter-day Saints (LDS Church) just before the Second Coming of Jesus Christ. Koyle's prophecies were controversial among leaders of the LDS Church, who excommunicated him in 1948.

Koyle died in 1949 and work on the Dream Mine ended in the 1960s, and the mine has not produced any valuable metals. However, Koyle's followers, known as "Dream Miners," have continued to maintain the mine and to trade stock in it. They believe that the mine will produce gold before the Second Coming and that Koyle's other prophecies will be fulfilled.

Background

John Hyrum Koyle

John Koyle was born in Spanish Fork, Utah, on August 14, 1864, to John Hyrum Koyle, Sr. and Adlinda Hillman. In 1886, he dreamed that an angel told him he would find a lost cow in a field that had an injured horn which poked its own eye. That morning he reportedly saw the injured cow, just as the voice had told him, strengthening his belief in the restored gospel of the LDS Church.  Historian Kevin Cantera compared the Dream Miners' views of this experience with traditional LDS views of Joseph Smith's First Vision.

Koyle served as a missionary in the Southern States Mission from 1888 to 1891, where he became known for his prophetic dreams. On August 27, 1894, he reportedly had a dream in which the Angel Moroni brought him to a Nephite mine on a nearby mountain, showing him nine caverns full of treasures buried by the Nephites, including the sword of Laban, the Urim and Thummim, and the golden plates. The angel instructed him to reopen this mine and dig new tunnels, and said that it would provide financial aid during an economic collapse.  The angel also told him that the mine's gold would help provide financial relief for the LDS Church, and fund the gathering of Israel in the last days.

Historical setting
During Koyle's lifetime, the LDS Church moved more into America's religious mainstream, starting with the 1890 Manifesto and the Reed Smoot hearings, both of which dealt with the practice of polygamy. In the 1900s, church leaders started emphasizing Joseph Smith's First Vision, focusing less on his mystical worldview and early treasure hunting activities.

American historian D. Michael Quinn viewed the Dream Mine as a product of early Mormonism's magical worldview, a result of Joseph Smith's "superstitious and schismatic" practices. Quinn viewed the LDS Church's opposition of the mine as a rejection of this worldview. American folklorist Wayland Hand wrote that Koyle might have been influenced by the LDS Church's financial situation during the leadership of Wilford Woodruff. At the time of the mine's construction, the LDS Church was still struggling from anti-polygamy legislation passed in the 1880s. Koyle may have envisioned that the Dream Mine would rescue the church from its contemporary financial problems.

History

Construction and incorporation
On September 17, 1894, Koyle and five of his friends started excavating the place on the mountain which he had seen in his dream. The mine is located east of Salem on the Wasatch Mountains at the base of what is now called Knob Hill. It was incorporated on March 4, 1909, and 114,000 shares of stock were issued. About 42,000 shares with a par value of $1 were sold to the public for $1.50 per share.  Some early LDS Church leaders held stock in the Dream Mine, such as J. Golden Kimball and Matthew Cowley, as did Carter E. Grant, a nephew of Heber J. Grant.  In 1910, Koyle was appointed bishop of the Leland ward. By the end of 1913, the mine descended , and a pump was installed to stop it from flooding.

Koyle said that he was visited by two of the Three Nephites in a dream on January 10, 1914. These messengers told him that the Dream Mine would be a "Relief Mine" which would provide financial relief after the disasters leading up to the Second Coming. The mine would be the first "City of Refuge," providing material survival until plural marriage and the United Order were reestablished. They also warned Koyle that the Dream Mine would face "false rumors" and experience opposition from leaders of the LDS Church.

Opposition from the LDS Church

In 1913, Mormon apostle and geologist James E. Talmage examined some ore from the Dream Mine and reported to church headquarters that it was worthless.  On August 16, 1913, the LDS Church issued a statement entitled "A Warning Voice" directed at Koyle's Dream Mine. The introduction to this statement reads:

Five days after this was published, Koyle was released from his calling as bishop and succeeded by Lars Olsen, one of Koyle's followers. This 1913 statement would be recited in 1970 by LDS Church president Harold B. Lee.

The Dream Mine was closed in 1914 because of the opposition from the LDS Church, and it was reopened in September 1920 due to a $2,000 debt that the Dream Miners owed to the Spanish Fork Church Co-Operative. Work on the mine recommenced, and the main shaft soon descended . In May and July 1928, Talmage denounced the Dream Mine in articles published in the Church section of the Deseret News.

Later history
In 1929, a small deposit of platinum was reportedly discovered in the mine. Five years later, Koyle and his followers started constructing an ore mill called the "White Sentinel" just outside the Dream Mine. The mill was finished in 1936, and it processed one load of ore worth $103.03 before being shut down the next year. On January 20, 1933, the geologist Frederick J. Pack published a review of mineral samples taken from the Dream Mine in the Deseret News, declaring them practically worthless. State prosecutors from the U.S. Securities and Exchange Commission investigated the mine, and found no evidence of fraud, as improvements to the mine were more valuable than the money taken in, and its stockholders were apparently satisfied.

Koyle was brought before a disciplinary council in 1947 and was told that he could either repudiate his revelations concerning the Dream Mine or be excommunicated. He signed a notarized statement repudiating his revelations, which was then published in the Deseret News on January 8, 1947. Koyle soon said that he had been forced to sign this statement, and the LDS Church excommunicated him on April 18, 1948.  Koyle died on May 17, 1949 in Payson, Utah.

The Relief Mine Company
In 1962, brothers Quayle and Sheldon Dixon founded the Relief Mine Company to succeed the Koyle Mining Company. The Relief Mine Company continues to do assessment work for the mine. Work on the mine continued in the 1960s until the excavators encountered a capstone (caprock) which they could not drill through.  Work on the mine became too costly to continue, and the company now earns money through a rental home, a gravel pit, and an orchard watered with the mine's water. A geological survey of the Dream Mine during this time found only limestone and quartzite, with no trace of metallic minerals.

The Internal Revenue Service audited the Relief Mine Company in 1981.  In 1984, company officials said that the mine had over 6,000 stockholders. In 2010, the company had at least 706 stockholders. Each share during this time was worth $10 at most, though investors would purchase a share for $30 to $35.  In May 2018, the company's board reported it had more than 7,500 active stockholders.

In the 2000s, some Dream Miners formed an online community and email group to discuss the mine and Koyle's prophecies.  During the 2016 United States presidential election, some Dream Miners speculated that the presidential campaign of Donald Trump would fulfill one of Koyle's prophecies, in which a Republican elephant would die during an election.

References

Further reading

External links

ReliefMine.com, official website of the Relief Mining Company
"Apocalyptic Paydirt in Utah," by Eric S. Peterson of Salt Lake City Weekly

1894 establishments in Utah Territory
1914 disestablishments in Utah
1920 establishments in Utah
Buildings and structures in Utah County, Utah
Christian eschatology
The Church of Jesus Christ of Latter-day Saints in Utah
Mines in Utah
Mormon folklore
Salem, Utah